The bighead searsid (Holtbyrnia anomala) is a species of tubeshoulder fish.

Description

Its head is large, making up over a third of the fish's length. It has 25–31 gillrakers; 5–11 pyloric caecae. The snout is pointed, with premaxillary tusks pointing forward.

It is dark red in colour. Its photophores are rudimentary (except for the shoulder organ), hence its specific name anomala ("unusual").

Habitat

References

Platytroctidae
Fish described in 1980
Bioluminescent fish